"(If You Let Me Make Love To You Then) Why Can't I Touch You?" is a song written by Charles Courtney and Peter Link. It came from the musical, Salvation.

Ronnie Dyson recording
In 1970, "(If You Let Me Make Love to You Then) Why Can't I Touch You?" was recorded by Ronnie Dyson.  It reached #8 on the Billboard Hot 100 and #9 on the R&B chart.  It peaked at #68 in Australia.  The track appeared on Dyson's debut album of the same name.

References

1970 singles
1970 songs
Johnny Mathis songs
Ronnie Dyson songs
Columbia Records singles